Andrew James Stewart Ference (born March 17, 1979) is a Canadian former professional ice hockey defenseman. Ference played for the Pittsburgh Penguins, Calgary Flames, Boston Bruins and the Edmonton Oilers. In 2011, Ference helped the Bruins to their sixth Stanley Cup championship. Ference was born in Edmonton, Alberta, but grew up in Sherwood Park, Alberta.

Playing career

WHL and Pittsburgh Penguins
Ference began his hockey career in the Western Hockey League (WHL) with the Portland Winterhawks. After two full seasons with the team, he was selected 208th overall by the Pittsburgh Penguins in the 1997 NHL Entry Draft. Ference was not ranked by Central Scouting for the draft. In response, Ference sent a letter to every NHL general manager indicating his belief he would play in the NHL and also enclosed testing results conducted by the University of Alberta. Ference played two more seasons with Portland and had a brief stint in the International Hockey League (IHL) with the Kansas City Blades before joining Pittsburgh in 1999.

After making his NHL debut on October 1, 1999, in a game against the Dallas Stars, Ference scored his first NHL goal a month later against the Nashville Predators on November 13, 1999. He split his rookie season between Pittsburgh and their American Hockey League (AHL) affiliate, the Wilkes-Barre/Scranton Penguins, finishing with 6 points (2 goals, 4 assists) in 30 NHL games and 28 points (8 goals, 20 assists) in 44 AHL games.

The next season, Ference continued to share time between both Penguins teams. Ference played in his first NHL playoffs with Pittsburgh in 2001, playing 18 games and scoring 3 goals and 10 points before the Penguins were eliminated by the New Jersey Devils. In his third NHL season, Ference established himself as a full-time NHLer, scoring 11 points in 75 games.

Calgary Flames and NHL Lockout
On February 9, 2003, in the middle of the 2002–03 season, Ference was traded to the Calgary Flames for future considerations. He posted 4 assists in 16 games during the remainder of the season with Calgary. The next season, he registered 16 points with 4 goals and 12 assists in 72 games for Calgary and also played 26 playoff games posting 3 assists. Calgary reached the Stanley Cup Finals, where they lost to the Tampa Bay Lightning.

With the 2004–05 NHL season suspended due to a lock-out, Ference played in the Czech Republic for HC České Budějovice. Ference returned to the Flames when the NHL restarted the next season. He played all 82 games of the season for the first time in his career, scoring 4 goals, and 27 assists for a career high 31 points.

Boston Bruins
The following season, on February 10, 2007, he was traded, along with teammate Chuck Kobasew, to the Boston Bruins for defenceman Brad Stuart and centre Wayne Primeau. Ference scored 1 goal, along with 15 assists, during the 2008–09 NHL season. On March 23, 2010, he agreed on a three-year contract extension with the Bruins worth an annual average salary of $2.25 million.

On April 22, 2011, Ference was fined $2,500 for an obscene gesture to the crowd at the Bell Centre in Game 4 of the playoffs first round series against the Montreal Canadiens. Ference's initial comments after the incident indicated it was an "equipment malfunction," though he later confessed it had been an intentional gesture following an emotional playoff goal. Some teammates credited this incident as a turning point in their eventual Stanley Cup Victory. In the Bruins 4–3 game 7 victory over the Montreal of the same series, Ference drew much ire for a questionable collision to the head of Canadiens' Jeff Halpern, but upon a disciplinary hearing it was ruled that the hit did not warrant any sort of disciplinary action.

On June 15, 2011, Ference and the Boston Bruins defeated the Vancouver Canucks 4–0 in Game 7 of the Final to win the Stanley Cup.

The next season Ference scored 6 goals, a career high, and was named alternate captain during home games for the first half of the season, and during away games for the second half of the season.

Edmonton Oilers
On July 5, 2013, he signed a four-year deal as a free agent with his hometown team, the Edmonton Oilers. On September 29, Ference was named the 14th captain in Oilers NHL franchise history, succeeding Shawn Horcoff, who had been traded to the Dallas Stars. On October 7, 2015, after serving as the Oilers captain for the past two seasons, it was announced that Ference had relinquished his role as captain and was named as an alternate captain, along with Taylor Hall, Jordan Eberle and Ryan Nugent-Hopkins. After playing in just six games of the 2015–16 NHL season, Ference was placed on IR to undergo season-ending hip surgery.

On September 16, 2016, Ference announced his retirement after 16 seasons. He however remained on the Oilers long-term injured list for the duration of the 2016–17 season, before formally ending his career at the conclusion of his contract on July 13, 2017.

Post playing career 

In 2018 Ference joined the NHL as its first director of social impact, growth and fan development. His focus will be on grass-roots growth, community development efforts, engaging minority fans and players, and better facilitating relations between players and the league.

Personal life

Family
Ference and Krista Bradford, a former professional snowboarder, married in 2002. They have two daughters together.

Environmentalism
Ference's association with environmentalist David Suzuki while in Calgary led him to create a carbon-neutral program for the NHL, which now includes over 500 players who purchase carbon offset credits to counteract the negative environmental impact of professional sports.

In February 2012, National Geographic began a ten-episode Web series called "Beyond the Puck" highlighting Andrew's life as a NHL Player and "eco-warrior."

Stanley Cup Parade
On September 5, 2011, following the Bruins Stanley Cup championship, Ference organized and led a parade and flash mob in Boston's North End, which is the area where he resided during the NHL season. After bringing the Stanley Cup to and from Spaulding Rehabilitation Hospital on a bike trailer, Ference brought the Cup to an area of the North End outside the TD Garden. There, the Cup was hoisted up on a platform carried by friends and family, and paraded through the North End, with many stops at local shops along the way. Ference and the other Cup-carriers were accompanied by a marching band, members of The Boston Bruins Ice Girls, and the Boston Bruins mascot Blades. Hundreds of fans also joined them for the parade, which was concluded with a dancing flash mob.

Other
Ference is a fan of English Premier League football club Arsenal F.C.

Ference is also a member of the popular November Project workout tribe in Boston and Edmonton.

Career statistics

Regular season and playoffs

International

Awards and honours

References

External links

1979 births
Living people
Boston Bruins players
Calgary Flames players
Canadian ice hockey defencemen
Edmonton Oilers players
Kansas City Blades players
Motor České Budějovice players
Pittsburgh Penguins draft picks
Pittsburgh Penguins players
Portland Winterhawks players
Ice hockey people from Edmonton
Sportspeople from Sherwood Park
Wilkes-Barre/Scranton Penguins players
King Clancy Memorial Trophy winners
Canadian expatriate ice hockey players in the Czech Republic
Canadian expatriate ice hockey players in the United States